Panasonic Lumix DMC-SZ1 is a digital camera by Panasonic Lumix. The highest-resolution pictures it records is 16.6 megapixels, through its 25mm Wide-Angle Leica DC VARIO-ELMAR.

Property
25mm Ultra Wide Angle LEICA DC Lens
10x Powerful Optical Zoom
HD Video Recording in MP4 Format
Mega Optical Image Stabilizer

References

External links

DMC-SZ1A on shop.panasonic.com
DMC-SZ1K on shop.panasonic.com
DMC-SZ1R on shop.panasonic.com
DMC-SZ1S on shop.panasonic.com
Panasonic Lumix DMC-SZ1 Ultra Compact Zoom Review

Point-and-shoot cameras
SZ1